Penndel is a borough in Bucks County, Pennsylvania, United States. The population was 2,328 at the 2010 census.

Geography
Penndel is located at  (40.156109, -74.914050).

Demographics

In 2014, the borough was estimated to be 72.4% Non-Hispanic White, 15.3% Black or African American, 2.3% Asian, 2.1% none of the former, and 2.6% were two or more races. 11.8% of the population were of Hispanic or Latino ancestry.

As of the 2010 census, the borough was 81.9% Non-Hispanic White, 8.6% Black or African American, 2.7% Asian, and 3.2% were two or more races. 4.3% of the population were of Hispanic or Latino ancestry.

As of the census of 2000, there were 2,420 people, 900 households, and 549 families residing in the borough. The population density was 5,541.5 people per square mile (2,123.6/km²). There were 927 housing units at an average density of 2,122.7 per square mile (813.4/km²). The racial makeup of the borough was 91.98% White, 3.02% African American, 0.12% Native American, 3.26% Asian, 0.08% Pacific Islander, 0.62% from other races, and 0.91% from two or more races. Hispanic or Latino of any race were 1.94% of the population.

There were 900 households, out of which 29.3% had children under the age of 18 living with them, 44.7% were married couples living together, 12.1% had a female householder with no husband present, and 39.0% were non-families. 33.3% of all households were made up of individuals, and 12.9% had someone living alone who was 65 years of age or older. The average household size was 2.40 and the average family size was 3.11.

In the borough the population was spread out, with 21.4% under the age of 18, 17.9% from 18 to 24, 30.0% from 25 to 44, 17.4% from 45 to 64, and 13.2% who were 65 years of age or older. The median age was 32 years. For every 100 females there were 90.4 males. For every 100 women age 18 and over, there were 84.4 men.

The median income for a household in the borough was $36,296, and the median income for a family was $46,336. Males had a median income of $33,813 versus $29,911 for females. The per capita income for the borough was $17,897. About 2.4% of families and 4.6% of the population were below the poverty line, including 5.3% of those under age 18 and 1.6% of those age 65 or over.

History
Penndel Borough, although small, is rich in history. The area, originally inhabited by the Lenape Indians, was settled by Thomas Langhorne, an English Quaker preacher, and by Henry Paulin, a Quaker Yeoman, on land grants from William Penn. Penndel remained a farming region until 1876 when the Philadelphia Reading Railroad began service, and the Langhorne train station was established. In 1878 Thomas Eastburn & Co. advertised 130 Building Lots in the area calling it "The Eden of Bucks County." Slowly individual homes and small businesses were built in close proximity to the railroad, and the town expanded from there. It began as the Eden Post Office, was incorporated as the borough of Attleboro on June 22, 1899; the name changed to South Langhorne in February 1911, and finally to Penndel on November 17, 1947. Today Penndel has both a thriving industrial district and residential areas with both new and historically significant homes.

Education

Penndel lies within the Neshaminy School District. Students attend Herbert Hoover Elementary School for grades K-4, Maple Point Middle School for grades 5-8, and Neshaminy High School for grades 9-12. Other schooling opportunities in Penndel are offered through the Roman Catholic parish school of Our Lady of Grace, located in the borough.

Landmarks

Rumpf Factory/Mill - Originally built and completed in 1898 for Mr. Frederick Rumpf's company Rumpf & Sons to manufacture cotton coverlets, table cloths, napkins and other linen goods.  The buildings stone was quarried locally on Mr. Rumpf's farm, formerly the Joyce property, and the sand was hauled from a pit just below neighboring Hulmeville Borough.  The original main factory building was three stories high, measured 405 feet in length and 38 feet in width.  It was connected by rail with the Philadelphia & Reading Railroad allowing railroad conveyance. George C. Dietrich of Philadelphia secured the building contract for $21,500. The original factory structure was completely destroyed by a fire in August 1901 and rebuilt in 1902. The factory building is still standing, it sits mostly empty and it's future is uncertain.

Transportation

U.S. Route 1 Business is the most significant highway passing through Penndel. It follows the Lincoln Highway on a northeast-southwest alignment across the northwestern portion of the borough. Pennsylvania Route 413 passes through the northern tip of the borough briefly along Bellevue Avenue and Lincoln Highway, becoming concurrent with US 1 Business. Pennsylvania Route 513 starts at PA 413 and heads southward along Bellevue Avenue to the south end of the borough.

SEPTA provides bus service to Penndel along City Bus Route 14, which runs between the Frankford Transportation Center in Northeast Philadelphia and the Oxford Valley Mall, Suburban Bus Route 129, which runs between Frankford Avenue and Knights Road in Northeast Philadelphia and the Oxford Valley Mall, and Suburban Bus Route 130, which runs between Frankford Avenue and Knights Road in Northeast Philadelphia and Bucks County Community College in Newtown. A SEPTA Regional Rail station is nearby, Langhorne station in Langhorne Manor, serving the West Trenton Line.

Climate

According to the Köppen climate classification system, Penndel has a Humid subtropical climate (Cfa). Cfa climates are characterized by all months having an average mean temperature > , at least four months with an average mean temperature ≥ , at least one month with an average mean temperature ≥  and no significant precipitation difference between seasons. Although most summer days are slightly humid in Penndel, episodes of heat and high humidity can occur with heat index values > . The average wettest month is July, which corresponds with the annual peak in thunderstorm activity. Episodes of extreme cold and wind can occur, with wind chill values < . Ice storms and large snowstorms depositing ≥  occur once every few years, particularly during nor’easters from December through February.

Ecology

According to the A. W. Kuchler U.S. potential natural vegetation types, Penndel would have a dominant vegetation type of Appalachian Oak (104) with a dominant vegetation form of Eastern Hardwood Forest (25). The spring bloom typically begins by April 7 and fall color usually peaks by November 4.

References

George Bruce. Harbottle's Dictionary of Battles. (Van Nostrand Reinhold, 1981).

External links

 Borough of Penndel

Populated places established in 1874
Boroughs in Bucks County, Pennsylvania
1874 establishments in Pennsylvania